Indian Creek is a former settlement in Monroe County, West Virginia, United States. Indian Creek was located in western Monroe County along Indian Creek; its precise location is unknown.

References

Geography of Monroe County, West Virginia
Ghost towns in West Virginia